Psectrotarsia euposis is a species of moth of the family Noctuidae. It is found in several states around Mexico City.

The length of the forewings is 14.6–17.4 mm.

External links
 Species info Revision of the Genus Psectrotarsia Dognin, 1907 (Lepidoptera: Noctuidae: Heliothinae)

Heliothinae